Nigeria Airways Ltd., more commonly known as Nigeria Airways, was a Nigerian airline. The company was founded in 1958 after the dissolution of West African Airways Corporation (WAAC). It held the name  West African Airways Corporation Nigeria (WAAC Nigeria) until 1971, when it was rebranded to the name it had until it ceased operations in 2003. The government of Nigeria owned a majority of the airline (51%) until 1961, when it boosted its shareholding in the company to 100% and made it the country's flag carrier. At the time of dissolution, the airline's headquarters were at Airways House in Abuja. Operations were concentrated at Murtala Muhammed International Airport and served both domestic and international destinations mainly concentrated in West Africa; the network also had points in Europe, North America and Saudi Arabia. The airline was managed by a number of foreign companies, including British Airways, KLM and South African Airways.

Nigeria Airways had its heyday in the early 1980s, just before the departure of a KLM team that had been hired to make the airline efficient and profitable. At that time, its fleet consisted of about 30 aircraft, but the carrier was two years behind with its accounts to the extent that aircraft were acquired for cash. Owned or leased, the carrier operated a variety of aircraft during its history, including the Vickers VC10, the Airbus A310, the Boeing 737 and 747 and the McDonnell Douglas DC-10, of which it flew the last one ever built. Plagued by mis-management, corruption, and overstaffing, at the time of closure the airline had debts totalling , a poor safety record, and its operative fleet comprised a single aircraft flying domestic routes as well as two leased aircraft operating the international network. Nigeria Airways was succeeded by Virgin Nigeria, and the ground facilities were taken over by Arik Air.

History

Early years
The airline came into being on  under the name West African Airways Corporation Nigeria Limited (WAAC Nigeria), also known as Nigerian Airways, to succeed the folded West African Airways Corporation (WAAC); the title "WAAC" was retained due to the prestige this company had previously earned. Initially, the carrier was a tripartite entity in which the Nigerian government was the major shareholder (51%), and Elder Dempster Lines and British Overseas Airways Corporation (BOAC) held the balance (32 and 16, respectively). WAAC Nigeria inherited some aircraft previously owned by WAAC. On the same day, WAAC Nigeria signed a 15-year agreement with BOAC to charter Stratocruisers and Bristol Britannias for serving long-haul flights between Nigeria and the United Kingdom. The contract also contemplated that these routes would be operated in a pool agreement, whereby tickets could be issued by one airline for flights operated by the other, with the revenues being shared.

At , the fleet comprised one de Havilland Dove, eight de Havilland Herons and eight Douglas DC-3s. In early 1961, Nigeria became the only owner of the company by buying the shares held by BOAC and Elder Dempster; the airline became the flag carrier of the country. The entire Heron fleet was withdrawn from service in March 1961 as it proved economically inviable. Aimed at replacing the DC-3 fleet, five Fokker Friendship 200s were ordered late that year, with options being taken on two more. The Friendships joined the fleet between January and May 1963, and were deployed on regional routes, including those that served Abidjan, Accra, Bathurst, Dakar, Freetown and Robertsfield. The contract with BOAC was revised and a new agreement was signed in April of the same year. By June, the DC-3s had begun to be replaced by the Friendships on routes to Gambia, Ghana, Ivory Coast, Liberia, Senegal, Sierra Leone, and Leopoldville. However, the type would continue to be deployed on the Kano–Cotonou–Lomé–Accra passenger service and the Lagos-Kano freighter route. The first air link between Nigeria and the United States was launched in early . Called ″Operation Fantastic", it linked Lagos with New York and was operated by Pan Am using Boeing 707s and Douglas DC-8s, but an agreement between both countries allowed Nigeria Airways to sell a limited number of seats on these flights.

At this time, the fleet comprised one Piper Aztec, one Douglas DC-3 and six Fokker F27s that worked on a domestic network and regional routes that extended west, as far as Dakar, operated in a pool agreement with Ghana Airways; the European list of destinations included Frankfurt, London, Madrid and Rome, all of them served with VC10s chartered from BOAC. On 22 January 1971, the company was rebranded as Nigeria Airways. At this time the airline used aircraft leasing as a common practice: Boeing 707s that flew the Lagos–London route were leased from Laker Airways and Ethiopian Airlines until a new Boeing 707-320C was incorporated into the fleet and deployed on the route in August 1971, and in October 1971 a Boeing 737 was leased from Aer Lingus. Another Boeing 707-320C was ordered in 1972, along with two Boeing 737-200s. A Boeing 707 was leased from Aer Lingus in April 1972 for deployment mainly on the Lagos–London route, with the provision of crew and maintenance. In October 1972, a Fokker F28 entered the fleet on a lease agreement with Fokker, and later on aircraft of this type were ordered. In late 1972, a contract for management assistance was signed with Trans World Airlines, with the American carrier providing specialists in different managerial, commercial, and financial fields for five years, but the contract was never exercised. Nigeria Airways took delivery of three Boeing 707s in February 1973; they were put into service on the Lagos–London run immediately. Two Boeing 737s, with registrations 5N-ANC and 5N-AND, were delivered in the early 1970s.

Golden years 

At  the workforce was 2,400 strong and the fleet consisted of two Boeing 707-320Cs, two Boeing 737-200s, three Fokker F28s, five Fokker F27s, and one Piper Aztec, while five F28-2000s were on order. The route network at this time comprised domestic destinations served from Kano and Lagos, and international routes to Abidjan, Amsterdam, Accra, Bathurst, Beirut, Brussels, Dakar, Douala, Frankfurt, Freetown, London, Madrid, Monrovia, New York, Paris and Rome. In , the company became the 83rd customer for the Boeing 727, when an order for two Boeing 727-200s and another Boeing 707-320C was placed; it also took possession of a Douglas DC-10-30. This DC-10 was a 300-seater, all-economy aircraft that operated between Nigeria and Saudi Arabia. At this time the carrier took possession of two more 707s. A second DC-10-30 was ordered in early 1977. On 25 April 1977 an F-27, 5N-AAW, had an accident in Sokoto when it overran the runway, and on 1 March 1978 an F-28 (5N-ANA) had a fatal accident near Kano, killing all 16 occupants of the aircraft plus two more people on the ground. An order for two F28-4000s, that would complement the six F28-2000s the airline had in operation, was placed in late 1978. It was mostly aimed at training Nigeria Airways' employees in airline management in order to make the airline efficient and profitable.

A service to Jeddah was launched in 1980. By , the fleet consisted of 26 aircraft, split into three Boeing 707-320Cs, two Boeing 727-200s, two Boeing 737-200s, two DC-10-30s, two F27-200s, two F27-400Ms, four F27-600s, six F28-2000s, two F28-4000s, and one Aztec. The two DC-10s were purchased for cash. Nigeria Airways became Airbus' 40th customer in 1981, when it placed an order for four Airbus A310-200s. Four new Boeing 737-200s were ordered in early 1981 for  including spare parts, and late that year an order for four more aircraft of the type was placed. In 1982, Boeing 747s were successively leased from the Danish charter airline Scanair and SAS; the aircraft were deployed on services to the United Kingdom, permitting the DC-10s to be used on new routes to Frankfurt, Paris, and Zurich. The airline took possession of four new Boeing 737-200s in early 1983 that would replace leased aircraft of the same type; they were acquired with a loan of  million that was arranged with seven major banks. On 28 November 1983, a Fokker F28 (5N-ANF) crashed while on approach to Enugu, claiming 23 lives from the 72 people on board. Following this accident the carrier decided to withdraw its Fokker fleet from service. A military coup d'état that took place in the last day of 1983 changed the structure of the government and the airline: Bernard Banfa was appointed managing director and many of the staff trained by KLM were dismissed. The 225-seater A310-200s were incorporated into the fleet in late 1984 and early 1985. Three of these aircraft bore the names Rima River, River Ethiope and Lekki Peninsula.

Demise
The introduction of International Monetary Fund policies, along with corruption, mismanagement and overstaffing, led to a steady decline of Nigeria Airways from the 1980s. The carrier had accumulated significant debts that outstripped its revenues from the mid-1980s, to the extent that aircraft were detained or impounded for unpaid debts. This situation prompted the airline to increase its domestic and international fares by 100% and 20%, respectively, in order to raise funds to alleviate the deficit, but this measure reduced the passenger traffic. Even though 1,000 jobs had been cut by late 1986 and 1,700 in the course of the previous year, Nigeria ordered the airline to further downsize (the number of employees was 8,500 at the time—or 500 for each aircraft in the fleet, twice the international average—) and to reduce or discontinue unprofitable routes. In 1988, cost-cutting measures led to the discontinuance of flights to a number of African destinations, including Cotonou, Dakar, Douala, Kinshasa, Monrovia and Nairobi, and to the transfer of some routes to the privately owned airline Okada Air; some of these routes were resumed a year later. In December 1988 the airline dismissed 3,000 employees, a third of the workforce, in an effort to keep operations afloat. In the late 1980s the airline lost a deposit worth  for not firming up an order for six ATR-42s. Financed by a Japanese leasing company, the carrier phased in the last DC-10 ever built; the aircraft was delivered in 1989, and replaced an aircraft of the same type that was lost in an accident two years earlier.

With a payroll of 6,632 at March 1990, the airline had a fleet of three Airbus A310-200s, three Boeing 707-320Cs, eight Boeing 737-200s and two DC-10-30s. A large domestic network serving the 19 Nigerian states was operated, as well as routes to East and West Africa; intercontinental flights from Lagos to Amsterdam, Jeddah, London, New York and Rome, from Kano to Amsterdam, Jeddah, London and Rome, and from Port Harcourt to London were also undertaken. The carrier suffered a major accident on 11 July 1991, when all 261 people on board a Douglas DC-8-61, registration C-GMXQ, crashed near Jeddah. In 1992, Nigeria Airways had three Boeing 707s impounded in Europe, and the number of flights experienced a 32% reduction following the termination of services to Conakry, Freetown and Robertsfield (Monrovia). Privatisation was first considered in 1993 with a proposal to split Nigeria Airways in two companies, one bearing the same name and operating domestic routes and a new one named Air Nigeria, which would undertake the international operations. In July 1994, an Airbus was impounded at London Heathrow Airport owing to a debt worth £100,000. On 21 December of the same year, a Boeing 707, registration 5N-ABK, crashed near Hadejia on a freighter flight from Jeddah, killing three of a crew of five. Further staff reductions continued throughout the first half of the 1990s, and at September 1995 the airline had 4,500 employees. In 1997 the UK Civil Aviation Authority banned the airline from operating into its territory citing safety concerns; in return, the Nigerian government barred British Airways from operating in the country. The service was restored in 1998 when the carrier began codesharing with British Airways, deploying a leased Boeng 747-200 that wore a Nigeria Airways livery and was operated on the Lagos–London Heathrow route with mixed English and Nigerian crews. By the late 1990s, the Nigerian government decided the carrier would be privatised by selling 40% and 20% to foreign and local investors, respectively, and keeping the rest of the shares. In 1999, the International Finance Corporation (IFC) was commissioned by the Nigerian government to assist in the process of restructuring and privatisation of the airline. Among three options, one of them was to partner with a large European airline; Air France, British Airways, Lufthansa, Swissair and Virgin Atlantic were all considered. Another alternative was to liquidate the carrier.

At April 2000, the number of employees was 4,516. At this time, an Airbus A310-200, three Boeing 737-200 Advanced, one Boeing 747-200B Combi and one McDonnell Douglas DC-10-30 served a route network that included Abuja, Calabar, Douala, Dubai, Jeddah, Jos, Kaduna, Kano, Kinshasa, Lagos, Libreville, London, Maiduguri, Malabo, Port Harcourt, Sokoto and Yola. A fleet that had numbered 32 aircraft in 1984 had gradually reduced to just three aircraft in October 2000. The United Kingdom cited safety concerns again in 2001 when it refused to allow Nigeria Airways to operate the Lagos–London route, this time regarding the Boeing 747 that was leased from Air Djibouti to fly the route. That year, the IFC withdrew from its advisory position citing the unwillingness of both the company and the government to carry out the necessary measures that would make the airline attractive to potential investors. Later on, there were various allegations claiming the airline's failure was accelerated by former Nigerian rulers who looted and mismanaged the company, to the extent that the government started an investigation into the disappearance of more than  million between 1983 and 1999.

In May 2003, when Nigeria Airways had a Boeing 737-200 as its sole serviceable aircraft, the government decided not to pump more money into the overstaffed carrier but to liquidate it. The decision was based on the declining performance of the airline's last 15 years of operations and on the carrier's debts. The number of carried passengers had fallen from 2,1 million in 1985 to just 10,000 in the first quarter of 2003, and it controlled just 6% and 1% of the domestic and the international markets, respectively. The carrier owed over  million, despite the government having injected  million into the company in its last decade of operations. The airline ceased operations in 2003 and was liquidated a year later. The Nigerian government later came to an agreement with Virgin Atlantic to found Virgin Nigeria, intended as a replacement. Even though Virgin Nigeria succeeded Nigeria Airways, the ground facilities of the folded Nigeria Airways were eventually taken over by the then-startup carrier Arik Air.

Corporate affairs
Nigeria Airways had its headquarters at Airways House in Abuja at the time of dissolution. It had been moved from Murtala Muhammed Airport between 1999 and 2000. The airline logo consisted of the Nigerian flag with a green elephant named Skypower in its centre.

Destinations

At the time of closure the Nigeria Airways network consisted of four domestic destinations, namely Abuja, Kano, Lagos and Port Harcourt. The international network comprised five routes, to Abidjan, Dubai, Jeddah, London and New York.

Fleet

The following aircraft types were operated by Nigeria Airways during the course of its history:

 Airbus A300B4
 Airbus A310-200
 Piper Aztec
 BAC One-Eleven 400
 Boeing 377 Stratocruiser
 Boeing 707-120
 Boeing 707-120B
 Boeing 707-320
 Boeing 707-320B
 Boeing 707-320C
 Boeing 707-420
 Boeing 727-100
 Boeing 727-200
 Boeing 737-200
 Boeing 737-200 Advanced
 Boeing 737-200C
 Boeing 737-400
 Boeing 747-100
 Boeing 747-200
 Boeing 747-200B
 Boeing 747-200 Combi
 Boeing 747-200F
 Boeing 747-300
 Boeing 767-200ER
 Boeing 767-300ER
 Bristol Britannia 100
 de Havilland Comet
 Douglas C-47A
 Douglas DC-3
 Douglas DC-8-30
 Douglas DC-8-50
 Douglas DC-8-60
 De Havilland Dove
 Fokker F27-200
 Fokker F27-400
 Fokker F27-600
 Fokker F-28-1000
 Fokker F-28-2000
 Fokker F-28-4000
 de Havilland Heron
 McDonnell Douglas DC-10-10
 McDonnell Douglas DC-10-30
 Vickers VC-10
 Vickers Viscount 810

Accidents and incidents
Aviation Safety Network records 16 events for the airline, eight of which led to fatalities. The worst accident experienced by the carrier took place on 11 July 1991, when 261 people were killed in an accident at King Abdulaziz International Airport. The following list includes events that had reported fatalities, there was a hull-loss of the aircraft involved, or both.

See also
 Airlines of Africa
 Transport in Nigeria

Notes

References

Bibliography

External links
 - Flight International reporting inquiry in 1969 on Nigeria Airways

 
1958 establishments in Nigeria
Defunct airlines of Nigeria
Airlines established in 1958
Airlines disestablished in 2003
Government-owned airlines
2003 disestablishments in Nigeria
Economy of Abuja
British Overseas Airways Corporation